Missionary conference may refer to:

Conferences
 1910 World Missionary Conference
 China Centenary Missionary Conference
 United Missionary Conference of the National Council of Churches of Kenya

Denominations
 Institutional Missionary Baptist Conference of America
 Maranatha Bible and Missionary Conference in Muskegon, Michigan, owner of the former WMBC-LP radio station